Wellington Park is a public park in Portland, Oregon. The  park in Northeast Portland's Roseway neighborhood was acquired in 1941.

In 2021, Commissioner Carmen Rubio announced funding for a "splash pad style outdoor play area" in the park. Wellington has also hosted concerts and Movies in the Park.

References

External links

 

1941 establishments in Oregon
Parks in Portland, Oregon
Roseway, Portland, Oregon